Bagri may refer to:

 Something from, or related to the Bagar region of India and Pakistan
 Bagri language, a Rajasthani language spoken in the Bagar region
 Bagri clan, the name of several lineages of the Bagar region
 Bagri camel, a breed of camel
 Bagrinagar, a village in Rajasthan, India

People with the name 
 Ajaib Singh Bagri, Indian-Canadian terrorist
 Mani Ram Bagri (1920–2012), Indian politician
 Raj Bagri, Baron Bagri (1930–2017), Indian-born British businessman and politician

See also 
 Baghri, a social group of India